Al Khaburah is a Wilayat of Al Batinah North in the Sultanate of Oman.

References 

Populated places in Oman